Mohamed Abdilaahi (born as Mohamed Mohumed on 24 March 1999) is a German long-distance runner. He competed in the 5000 metres at the 2020 Summer Olympics.

Born in Germany, he is of Somali descent.

References

External links

German male long-distance runners
Athletes (track and field) at the 2020 Summer Olympics
1999 births
Living people
Olympic athletes of Germany
Sportspeople from Mönchengladbach
German people of Somali descent
21st-century German people